The first season of Chinese Million Star, began on July 3, 2011, is a Taiwanese televised singing competition, the last episode aired on January 8, 2012, with a special episode airing on January 15, 2012. The first season consist of 28 episodes.

The first season of Chinese Million Star was won by Taiwan-American singer Sharon Kwan, while Li Qian and Malaysian Singer Nicole Lai named runner-up and third place, respectively. Lai was named the "Most Popular" singer of the season.

Production

Contestants

Episodes

Episode 1

Contestants will each be given 30 seconds to impress the judges with their vocals.
Each of the 5 judges will vote, 3 stars and above, the contestant will advanced to the next stage. 2 stars will require the contestants to perform his/her best song to gain another vote, if not, he/she will be deemed to be failed. One star or less deemed failed the competition.
Adding on, each of the 5 judges have a 'save pass' to save one of the contestants for the particular round. 
43 contestants were tested on this episode, 22 advanced to the next round, 5 contestants were revived, 16 contestants failed the competition.

Episode 2

Contestants will each be given 30 seconds to impress the judges with their vocals.
Each of the 5 judges will vote, 3 stars and above, the contestant will advanced to the next stage. 2 stars will require the contestants to perform his/her best song to gain another vote, if not, he/she will be deemed to be failed. One star or less deemed failed the competition.
Adding on, each of the 5 judges have a 'save pass' to save one of the contestants for the particular round. 
41 contestants were tested on this episode, 18 advanced to the next round, 5 contestants were revived, 18 contestants failed the competition.
In Total: 84 contestants were tested on this episode, 40 advanced to the next round, 10 contestants were revived, 34 contestants failed the competition.

Episode 3

2 duos will perform one song each, passing mark is set as 15 (out of a possible 30), if failed to reach that score, he/she will be in the fail zone. 5 will be eliminated after the show (judges will determine how many and who will leave the competition).
26 contestants were tested on this episode, 20 advanced to the next round, 6 contestants failed the competition.
Names who advanced onto next round: 乔于珊(15), 陈虹竹(18), 陈明露(16), 张思颖(14), 姚光庭(21), 黄剑文(13), 叶仁杰(14), 陈采婕(20), 吴盈静(23), 张喆稀(18), 杨声维(15), 刘知非(20), 关诗敏(26), 司安迪(16), 詹志伟(16), 范人杰(24), 黄俊融(25), 王舒婷(16), 黄捷(20), 黎谦(24)
Names who got eliminated: 余文秀(12), 李曦(15), 张馨云(10), 林长金(15), 苏婉珍(15), 张璟钰(15)

Episode 4

2 duos will perform one song each, passing mark is set as 15 (out of a possible 30), if failed to reach that score, he/she will be in the fail zone. 5 will be eliminated after the show (judges will determine how many and who will leave the competition).
24 contestants were tested on this episode, 18 advanced to the next round, 6 contestants failed the competition.
After Episode 3 & 4, 50 contestants were tested on this episode, 38 advanced to the next round, 12 contestants failed the competition.
Names who advanced onto next round: 陆伟鸿(18), 颜慧萍(20), 黄立强(22), 戴瑀慧(17), 赵洁莹(19), 王翎蓓(19), 李俊樫(17), 彭芷羚(21), 郑双双(21), 王乔尹(16), 詹桂琳(14), 张之翰(11), 周艺培(20), 刘悦(30), 关喆(19), 吴季儒(21), 王柯淇(25), 黄凯欣(27)
Names who got eliminated: 沈炜谦(16), 沈品彤(16), 刘定宏(15), 杨亭维(14), 黄安克(10), 王苡萁(13)
Special Guest: Vanness Wu

Episode 5

Contestants will be grouped by 2 per team, judges will give marks based on individual performance, those below the score of 15 (out of a possible 30) will be in the fail zone, 5 contestants will then be elimininated after the show. 
38 contestants were tested on this episode, 33 advanced to the next round, 5 contestants failed the competition.
Names who advanced onto next round: 王乔尹(18), 李俊樫(15), 刘悦(22), 颜慧萍(24), 赵洁莹(23), 王舒婷(20), 关喆(25), 范人杰(12), 詹桂琳(15), 陈虹竹(17), 黄俊融(17), 司安迪(17), 黎谦(17), 黄捷(16), 周艺培(18), 黄立强(15), 刘知非(20), 杨声维(16), 姚光庭(19), 陈采婕(22), 吴盈静(24), 王翎蓓(12), 陆伟鸿(12), 詹志伟(17), 郑双双(17), 叶仁杰(19), 黄剑文(19), 吴季儒(28), 戴瑀慧(28), 王柯淇(18), 关诗敏(24), 黄凯欣(23), 彭芷羚(23)
Names who got eliminated: 乔于珊(15), 陈明露(11), 张之翰(13), 张思颖(13), 张喆稀(14)

Episode 6

All 33 contestants will be split into 11 groups of 3. Host Matilda Tao will select the first contestant, then that contestant will select another contestant, and vice versa. Each contestant must attempt to score as high as possible, the lowest 2 contestants of the group will automatically be in the fail zone. The passing score is set at 15, those who score below that score, will also be in the fail zone. 5 contestants may be eliminated after this stage.
33 contestants were tested on this episode, 30 advanced to the next round, 3 contestants failed the competition.
Names who advanced onto next round: 吴盈静(24), 陆伟鸿(14), 黄凯欣(19), 陈虹竹(19), 郑双双(14), 黄立强(17), 周艺培(16), 李俊樫(11), 司安迪(17), 彭芷羚(9), 刘悦(24), 颜慧萍(26), 叶仁杰(10), 黄俊融(13), 詹志伟(14), 黄捷(19), 姚光庭(22), 戴瑀慧(12), 王翎蓓(25), 王柯淇(17), 吴季儒(15), 杨声维(11), 刘知非(11), 关诗敏(26), 王乔尹(14), 黎谦(23), 陈采捷(17), 王舒婷(15), 赵洁莹(22), 关喆(20)
Names who got eliminated: 范人杰(13), 詹桂琳(8), 黄剑文(13)
Special Guest: Il Volo

Episode 7

The passing score this week is set at 18, any contestant who score below that score will be in the fail zone. 3 to 5 contestants will be eliminated after this stage.
30 contestants were tested on this episode, 26 advanced to the next round, 4 contestants failed the competition.
Names who advanced onto next round: 黄立强(17), 司安迪(19), 刘悦(17), 詹志伟(15), 王舒婷(20), 王柯淇(15), 吴盈静(21), 周艺培(19), 彭芷苓(19), 姚光庭(19), 陆伟鸿(13), 吴季儒(15), 王翎蓓(13), 赵洁莹(24), 郑双双(18), 黄捷(17), 黄俊融(22), 杨声维(11), 戴瑀慧(12), 叶仁杰(12), 陈虹竹(17), 颜慧萍(22), 黎谦(24), 黄凯欣(17), 关喆(21), 关诗敏(27)
Names who got eliminated: 陈采婕(15), 王乔尹(12), 李俊坚(11), 刘知非(11)
Special Guest Star: Liu Jia Chang

Episode 8

The passing score this week is set at 18, any contestant who score below that score will be in the fail zone. 4 contestants will be eliminated after this stage.
14 contestants were tested on this episode, 8 advanced to the next round, 6 contestants failed the competition temporary.
Names who competed in this round (Pass Zone): 赵洁莹(20), 吴盈静(18), 黄立强(20), 刘悦(24), 黄俊融(25), 周艺培(18), 姚光庭(23), 颜慧萍(26)  
Names who competed in this round (Fail Zone): 司安迪(17), 彭芷羚(10), 杨声维(12), 詹志伟(15), 王舒婷(16), 陆伟鸿(13)
Special Appearance: Liu Jia Chang

Episode 9

The passing score this week is set at 18, any contestant who score below that score will be in the fail zone. 3 to 5 contestants will be eliminated after this stage.
12 contestants were tested on this episode, 5 advanced to the next round, 7 contestants failed the competition temporary.
In TOTAL (For Episodes 8 & 9): 26 contestants were tested on this episode, 22 advanced to the next round, 4 contestants failed the competition.
Names who competed in this round (Pass Zone): 黄凯欣(20), 关喆(18), 关诗敏(24), 黎谦(26), 黄捷(19) 
Names who competed in this round (Fail Zone): 陈虹竹(16), 王翎蓓(15), 郑双双(16), 叶仁杰(10), 戴瑀慧(10), 王柯淇(17), 吴季儒(12)
Names who advanced onto next round: 赵洁莹(20), 司安迪(17), 彭芷羚(10), 吴盈静(18), 杨声维(12), 黄立强(20), 刘悦(24), 黄俊融(25), 王舒婷(16), 周艺培(18), 姚光庭(23), 颜慧萍(26), 陈虹竹(16), 王翎蓓(15), 郑双双(16), 王柯淇(17), 黄凯欣(20), 吴季儒(12), 关喆(18), 关诗敏(24), 黎谦(26), 黄捷(19)
Names who got eliminated: 詹志伟(15), 陆伟鸿(13), 叶仁杰(10), 戴瑀慧(10)
Special Appearance: Liu Jia Chang

Episode 10

Teams will be split into 2 teams each of 11 contestants, both teams must PK with each other, the team with the lowest score must eliminate 2 contestants.
Teams belonging to Team 1: 彭芷苓(16), 关喆 & 司安迪(22), 吴季儒(29), 姚光庭, 王舒婷 & 周艺培(18), 黎谦 & 王翎蓓(22), 关诗敏(22), 刘悦(27)
Teams belonging to Team 2: 吴盈静(14), 陈虹竹 & 郑双双 (19), 黄凯欣(19), 王柯淇, 杨声维 & 黄立强(24), 黄捷 & 赵洁莹(21), 黄俊融(23), 颜慧萍(25)
Overall Score: Team 1: 156pts  |  Team 2: 145pts
22 contestants were tested on this episode, 22 advanced to the next round, 0 contestants failed the competition.

Episode 11

The passing score this week is set at 18, any contestant who score below that score will be in the fail zone. 4 contestants will be eliminated after this stage.
Names who advanced onto next round: 司安迪(19), 杨声维(16), 赵洁莹(19), 王翎蓓(19), 王柯淇(17), 王舒婷(16), 吴季儒(25), 刘悦(21), 姚光庭(20), 关喆(21), 黄捷(17), 郑双双(20), 吴盈静(21), 黎谦(25), 颜慧萍(25), 黄俊融(25), 关诗敏(25), 黄凯欣(19)
Names who got eliminated: 周艺培(15), 彭芷苓(17), 陈虹竹(16), 黄立强(17)
22 contestants were tested on this episode, 18 advanced to the next round, 4 contestants failed the competition.

Episode 12

The passing score this week is set at 18, any contestant who score below that score will be in the fail zone. 1 contestant will be eliminated after this stage.
Names who advanced onto next round: 司安迪(18), 王舒婷(19), 姚光庭(17), 赵洁莹(16), 吴季儒(17), 吴盈静(25), 黄捷(18), 王翎蓓(15), 黄凯欣(14), 王柯淇(18), 黄俊融(20), 刘悦(23), 郑双双(21), 颜慧萍(22), 黎谦(18), 关诗敏(30)
Names who got eliminated: 杨声维(12)
Contestant(s) who walked in this competition: 关喆
17 contestants were tested on this episode, 16 advanced to the next round, 1 contestants failed the competition,  1 contestant walked from the competition.
Special Appearance: Aska Yang

Episode 13

The passing score this week is set at 18, any contestant who score below that score will be in the fail zone. 1 contestant will be eliminated after this stage.
Names who advanced onto next round: 赵洁莹(20), 王翎蓓(15), 郑双双(14), 吴季儒(16), 黄捷(18), 姚光庭(18), 王柯淇(17), 颜慧萍(19), 吴盈静(15), 黎谦(20), 刘悦(22), 王舒婷(17), 黄俊融(20), 黄凯欣(19), 关诗敏(23)
Names who got eliminated: 司安迪(15)
16 contestants were tested on this episode, 15 advanced to the next round, 1 contestants failed the competition.
Special Appearance: S.H.E's Hebe Tian

Episode 14

The passing score this week is set at 18, any contestant who score below that score will be in the fail zone. 1 contestant will be eliminated after this stage.
Names who advanced onto next round: 黄俊融(20), 吴盈静(20), 王舒婷(15), 王翎蓓(19), 郑双双(17), 王柯淇(20), 黎谦(12), 黄凯欣(22), 吴季儒(18), 赵洁莹(21), 刘悦(19), 颜慧萍(21), 关诗敏(23), 黄捷(25)
Names who got eliminated: 姚光庭(12)
15 contestants were tested on this episode, 14 advanced to the next round, 1 contestants failed the competition.
Special Appearance: Jess Lee, Pumbaa/Timon

Episode 15

The passing score this week is set at 18, any contestant who score below that score will be in the fail zone. 1 contestant will be eliminated after this stage.
Names who advanced onto next round:
Names who got eliminated:
14 contestants were tested on this episode, 13 advanced to the next round, 1 contestant failed the competition.

Episode 16

The passing score this week is set at 18, any contestant who score below that score will be in the fail zone. 1 contestant will be eliminated after this stage.
Names who advanced onto next round:
Names who got eliminated:
13 contestants were tested on this episode, 12 advanced to the next round, 1 contestant failed the competition.

Episode 17

The passing score this week is set at 18, any contestant who score below that score will be in the fail zone. 1 contestant will be eliminated after this stage.
Names who advanced onto next round:
Names who got eliminated:
12 contestants were tested on this episode, 11 advanced to the next round, 1 contestant failed the competition.

Episode 18

The passing score this week is set at 18, any contestant who score below that score will be in the fail zone. 1 contestant will be eliminated after this stage.
Names who advanced onto next round:
Names who got eliminated:
11 contestants were tested on this episode, 10 advanced to the next round, 1 contestant failed the competition.

Episode 19

The passing score this week is set at 18, any contestant who score below that score will be in the fail zone. 1 contestant will be eliminated after this stage.
Names who advanced onto next round:
Names who got eliminated:Crystal Wang
10 contestants were tested on this episode, 9 advanced to the next round, 1 contestant failed the competition.

See also
One Million Star

Taiwanese television series
+